Lo Mejor de A.B. Quintanilla III y Los Kumbia Kings (English: The Best of A.B. Quintanilla III and Los Kumbia Kings) is the fifth compilation album and twelfth album by Mexican-American cumbia group A.B. Quintanilla y Los Kumbia Kings. It was released on July 1, 2016 by Capitol Latin. Lo Mejor de A.B. Quintanilla III y Los Kumbia Kings is the second album to be released after the breakup of Kumbia Kings.

Track listing

Charts

References

2016 greatest hits albums
Kumbia Kings albums
A. B. Quintanilla albums
Albums produced by A.B. Quintanilla
Albums produced by Cruz Martínez
Capitol Latin compilation albums
Spanish-language compilation albums
Cumbia albums
Albums recorded at Q-Productions